Hot Peaches was a drag theatre company in New York City that would put on one play a week, active from the 1970s-1990s. Hot Peaches was founded by Jimmy Camicia in 1972, who encountered a group of drag queens and began writing work for them to perform. Their work has been described as "political camp, dominated by drag".

Contents 

 1Description
 2Early work
 3Notable Members
 4References

Notable Members[edit] 

 Marsha P. Johnson, a prominent queer activist throughout the late 20th century, performed with the troupe starting in 1972 clear through the 90s.
 Peggy Shaw performed with the troupe through the first half of the 1970s as one of only three women at the time. She took on a prestigious role in the drag theater sphere after crossing paths with Spiderwomen during Hot Peaches' 1978 tour stop in Berlin. This encounter was formative for both the troupe and herself, as she went on the become a part of Spiderwomen and then co-found Split Britches in 1981 with Lois Weaver, another member of Spiderwomen.
 Bette Bourne was only a member for a year after experiencing his first Hot Peaches performance, The Heat, in 1974, though his time with the troupe influenced his creation of a similar, London-based group, Bloolips.

Troupe Culture[edit] 
While the group's main objective was performance, Hot Peaches' primary function was to provide a nurturing queer community, and a platform for members self-expression. Camicia has been quoted as saying "We're not actors, we're entertainers. Rather than becoming the script, the script becomes us." The impact of the community on its members also included interactions with fellow drag performance groups and queer revolutionaries. Jimmy Camicia and Peggy Shaw were influenced by a conversation on feminism with Mallory Jones, sister of Kate Millett, and thus instituted feminist messages into their performances.

The early work of the company often created their performances around the fashion and outfits its performers wanted to wear. These outfits were often ostentatious, sparkling outfits, which included platform boots and feather boas. The vibrancy of the troupes costumes became a defining moment during their European's tours stop in Berlin in 1978, when they lent their wardrobe to the Spiderwomen, whose luggage had been lost during travel. The two groups had conflicting styles. According to Lois Weaver, the Spiderwomen were a feminist troupe devoted to "deconstructing the feminist image," while Hot Peaches' wardrobe consisted of "excessive femininity".

References 

20th-century theatre
Drag groups
Defunct Theatre companies in New York City